Bidan (also Romanized as Bīdān) is a village in Rudkhaneh Rural District, Rudkhaneh District, Rudan County, Hormozgan Province, Iran. At the 2006 census, its population was 78, in 18 families.

References 

Populated places in Rudan County